In mathematics the Goodwin–Staton integral is  defined as :

 

It satisfies the following third-order nonlinear differential equation：

Properties 

Symmetry:
 

Expansion for small z:

References

 http://journals.cambridge.org/article_S0013091504001087
 
 http://dlmf.nist.gov/7.2
 https://web.archive.org/web/20150225035306/http://discovery.dundee.ac.uk/portal/en/research/the-generalized-goodwinstaton-integral(3db9f429-7d7f-488c-a1d7-c8efffd01158).html
 https://web.archive.org/web/20150225105452/http://discovery.dundee.ac.uk/portal/en/research/the-generalized-goodwinstaton-integral(3db9f429-7d7f-488c-a1d7-c8efffd01158)/export.html
 http://www.damtp.cam.ac.uk/user/na/NA_papers/NA2009_02.pdf
 F. W. J. Olver, Werner Rheinbolt, Academic Press, 2014, Mathematics,Asymptotics and Special Functions, 588 pages,  gbook

Special functions